Leuza (Läwyılğa) is a rural locality (a selo) and the administrative centre of Leuzinsky Selsoviet, Kiginsky District, Bashkortostan, Russia. The population was 1,076 as of 2010. There are 11 streets.

Geography 
Leuza is located 17 km northeast of Verkhniye Kigi (the district's administrative centre) by road. Verkhniye Kigi is the nearest rural locality.

References 

Rural localities in Kiginsky District
Ufa Governorate